Head River is an unincorporated community in Dade County, in the U.S. state of Georgia.

History
The first permanent settlement at Head River was made in the 1830s. A post office called Head River was established in 1913, and remained in operation until 1959.

References

Unincorporated communities in Dade County, Georgia